The Chief Minister of Himachal Pradesh is the chief executive of the Indian state of Himachal Pradesh. As per the Constitution of India, the governor is a state's de jure head, but de facto executive authority rests with the chief minister. Following elections to the Himachal Pradesh Legislative Assembly, the state's governor usually invites the party (or coalition) with a majority of seats to form the government. The governor appoints the chief minister, whose council of ministers are collectively responsible to the assembly. Given that he has the confidence of the assembly, the chief minister's term is for five years and is subject to no term limits.

Since 1952, seven people have been Chief Minister of Himachal Pradesh. Four of these belonged to the Indian National Congress party, including inaugural office-holder Yashwant Singh Parmar. After his first term ended in 1956, Himachal Pradesh was made a union territory, and the office of Chief Minister ceased to exist. In 1963, Parmar once again became Chief Minister, and during his reign, in 1971, Himachal regained full statehood. Until March 2015, when he was surpassed by Virbhadra Singh, Parmar was the state's longest-serving chief minister. Between 1993 and 2017, the chief ministership has changed hands every five years between Virbhadra Singh of the Congress and Prem Kumar Dhumal of the Bharatiya Janata Party.  All chief ministers except Shanta Kumar, belongs to the Rajput caste.

Chief ministers of Himachal Pradesh (1952–56) and (1963–present) 
The Chief Commissioner's Province of Himachal Pradesh was formed on 15 April 1948 through integration of 30 erstwhile princely-states. In 1951, Himachal Pradesh become a Part C state, under the Government of Part C State, 1951 and was brought under a Lt. Governor with 36 member Legislative Assembly. First elections to the Assembly were held in 1952. The Indian National Congress won 24 seats to form a government under Yashwant Singh Parmar.

In 1954, Bilaspur, another part-C State, was merged with Himachal Pradesh. In 1956 it was made a Union Territory and was placed under a Lt. Governor with a Territorial Council with limited powers. 

In 1963, Himachal Pradesh though being a Union Territory was provided with a Legislative Assembly. The Territorial Council was converted into the Legislative Assembly of the Union Territory. The assembly has its first sitting on 1 October 1971. On 18th December, 1970 the State of Himachal Pradesh Act was passed by Parliament and the new state came into being on 25 January 1971. Thus Himachal Pradesh emerged as the 18th state of Indian Union.

Timeline

Notes
Footnotes

References

External links
 Government of Himachal Pradesh, website
 Present Chief Minister of Himachal Pradesh, webpage

 
Himachal Pradesh
Chief Ministers